Cannon School is an independent, nonsectarian, college preparatory institution serving students in junior kindergarten through grade 12. The school enrolled approximately 1040 students for the 2022–2023 school year. Cannon School is located in Concord, North Carolina in Cabarrus County, on a  campus on Poplar Tent Road near the Cabarrus–Mecklenburg county line. The school is fully accredited by the Southern Association of Colleges and Schools and the Southern Association of Independent Schools.

History 
Cannon School was founded in 1969 as Cabarrus Academy. The school was located in the historic downtown Concord residence of local textile entrepreneur J.W. Cannon. In 1970, the IRS found that the school had a non-discriminatory admissions policy and was thus eligible for tax-exempt status.

In 1994 the school relocated to its current  campus in the northwestern corner of Cabarrus county, and in 1998 the Cabarrus Academy was renamed Cannon School.

Originally a school for junior kindergarten through eighth grade, Cannon expanded throughout the 1990s and graduated its first senior class in 2002. (Note: First "new" senior class. As Cabarrus Academy, the school did graduate seniors in its earlier years.)

Academics 
Cannon School offers small class sizes with a 9:1 student/teacher ratio. More than half of Cannon School's ninety-five full-time faculty members hold master's or doctoral degrees. The school provides before and after-school enrichment programs.

In 2009, 386 Advanced Placement (AP) exams were administered. The average combined SAT score of Cannon students between 2002 and 2008 is 1340, more than 200 points higher than Charlotte–Mecklenburg and Cabarrus public schools, as well as above the state and national average scores.  Cannon students averaged above the 90th percentile in every category on the national Education Records Bureau standardized test for students in grades one through eight.

More than fifty percent of Cannon students live in the Lake Norman area while one in five come to Cannon from Charlotte, Kannapolis, and Salisbury; one-quarter live in Concord. Cannon’s nineteen buses cover four counties with pick-up points in the Concord, Davidson, Huntersville, Mooresville, University City, and Salisbury areas.  Buses stop in The Point, The Peninsula, Greenfarm, River Run, Skybrook, Highland Creek, North Stone, and numerous other neighborhoods.

Cannon School offers Mandarin Chinese classes in the Middle School and Upper School. Cannon School has developed a sister school exchange program with Tianli International School of Luzhou, Sichuan, China. Each year, since 2004, local families host Chinese students and teachers in their homes during week-long visits to Cannon School and other points of interest around the Carolinas.

Campus 
Cannon School is made up of three separate "divisions":
Lower School: Junior Kindergarten–Grade 4
Middle School: Grades 5–8
Upper School: Grades 9–12

Campus facilities feature approximately sixty classrooms, two media centers, a multipurpose auditorium, a lecture hall, four computer labs and a technology center, four music suites, three art studios with a dark room and pottery area, six science labs, a full-service dining center, a dance studio, and two gymnasiums.

Recent additions include an enlarged Upper School building with eighteen new classrooms, science labs, an arts wing, enhanced sports facilities that include a new track and athletic field with stadium lights, and a new entrance. The Upper School Library provides access to electronic research databases.

Arts 
Junior Kindergarten–Grade 4 students receive extensive art and music instruction by full-time instructors.  Students in Grades 5–12 can choose from 11 choral and instrumental groups, and numerous visual arts, drama, and dance class offerings.

Athletics 
The Cannon School athletic program fields more than thirty sports teams in the Middle and Upper Schools, including 18 varsity teams. Teams compete in football, soccer, tennis, basketball, swimming, track and field, cross country, lacrosse, golf, baseball, softball, cheerleading, and volleyball. Cannon's sports teams are known as the Cougars - their colors are maroon and gold. (In early years, when the school was still Cabarrus Academy, the mascot was the road runner.)

Cannon School began fielding Middle School and junior varsity football teams beginning in the 2008–09 school year and a varsity team in 2009-10.

The Cannon School Cougars compete in the 4A division of the N.C. Independent School Athletic Association (NCISAA), and is currently a member of the Charlotte Independent Schools Athletic Association (CISAA), along with Charlotte Christian School, Charlotte Country Day School, Charlotte Latin School, and Providence Day School.  Though their opponents are predominantly other independent schools, Cannon occasionally schedules games with nearby public high schools.

State champions 2001–2011 in basketball, cross country (three-time), tennis, softball, swimming (five-time), golf (three-time), and track and field (four-time); four-time Wachovia Cup winner; individual recognition of students and coaches including Wendy’s High School Heisman nominations and All-Area recognition by the Charlotte Observer.

Notable alumni 
 Vicky Bruce, professional women's soccer player
 Harrison Burton, NASCAR Cup Series driver for Wood Brothers Racing
 Austin Cindric, NASCAR Cup Series driver for Team Penske, 2022 Daytona 500 winner, and 2020 NASCAR Xfinity Series champion.
 Jarell Eddie, professional basketball player
 Carter Faith, country music artist

References 

Schools in Cabarrus County, North Carolina
Private high schools in North Carolina
Private middle schools in North Carolina
Private elementary schools in North Carolina
Preparatory schools in North Carolina
Educational institutions established in 1969
1969 establishments in North Carolina